Eudonia gyrotoma is a moth in the family Crambidae. It was described by Edward Meyrick in 1909. This species is endemic to New Zealand.

The wingspan is about 20 mm. The forewings are light brassy-yellowish-fuscous, irrorated with white and sprinkled with dark fuscous. The hindwings are grey-whitish, the costa and termen suffused with light grey.

References

Moths described in 1909
Eudonia
Moths of New Zealand
Endemic fauna of New Zealand
Taxa named by Edward Meyrick
Endemic moths of New Zealand